The Texas Southern Tigers basketball team is the basketball team that represents Texas Southern University in Houston, Texas, United States. The team currently competes in the Southwestern Athletic Conference. Their current head coach is Johnny Jones, who took over after Mike Davis took the Detroit Mercy head coaching job on June 5, 2018. Texas Southern has appeared in the NCAA tournament 11 times, and most recently in 2023. The Tigers play their home games at the Health and Physical Education Arena.

Notable win
The Texas Southern Tigers defeated perennial power and nationally ranked Michigan State Spartans on December 20, 2014 in East Lansing, Michigan. The Tigers won in overtime with a score of 71–64.  TSU is the first HBCU team to beat a team that went on to reach the Final Four that same season.

Basketball rivalries

Prairie View A&M basketball rivalry

The Texas Southern-Prairie View A&M rivalry is the highest attended and most anticipated basketball series in the SWAC. In February 2015, the game at Texas Southern University had an attendance of 7,500+.

Southern University basketball rivalry

Since the 1990s, Texas Southern and Southern have been top contenders for the SWAC Championship every year. As a result, matchups between the schools are heavily anticipated and competitive.

Postseason results

NCAA tournament results

The Tigers have appeared in eleven NCAA Tournaments, the most in the conference. Their combined record is 3–11, tying them with Alcorn State for the most wins by a SWAC school in the tournament.

NIT results

The Tigers have appeared in two National Invitation Tournament (NIT). Their combined record is 0–2.

CIT results
The Tigers have appeared in the CollegeInsider.com Postseason Tournament (CIT), one time. Their record is 3–1.

NAIA tournament results
The Tigers have appeared in the NAIA Tournament seven times. Their combined record is 18–6. They were NAIA National Champions in 1977.

Notable players

Jeremy Combs (born 1995), basketball player for Israeli team Hapoel Ramat Gan Givatayim
Marvin Jones (born 1993), basketball player in the Israeli Basketball Premier League

References

External links